Jan Mak (born 21 June 1945) is a Dutch professional football manager.

Career
He was caretaker at amateur side HVV Den Haag in 1971.

After managing FC Volendam in his native Netherlands, Mak took charge of Swedish sides Halmstads BK between 1981 and 1984, IS Halmia, IK Brage and IF Elfsborg between 1988 and 1990. He also coached Tampereen Pallo-Veikot from Finland and Nejmeh SC of Lebanon.

He later managed the national team of the Seychelles on three occasions.

References

1945 births
Living people
Dutch football managers
FC Volendam managers
Halmstads BK managers
IK Brage managers
IF Elfsborg managers
Tampereen Pallo-Veikot managers
Seychelles national football team managers
Dutch expatriate football managers
Expatriate football managers in Sweden
Sportspeople from The Hague
IS Halmia managers
Expatriate football managers in Lebanon
Lebanese Premier League managers
Nejmeh SC managers
Sportspeople from Voorburg
Dutch expatriate sportspeople in Sweden
Dutch expatriate sportspeople in Lebanon
Dutch expatriate sportspeople in Finland
Expatriate football managers in Finland
Expatriate football managers in Seychelles
Dutch expatriates in Seychelles